In Tibetan culture and Sherpa culture, Dawa (also written ) is a word meaning "moon" or "month". It is often used as a name for children born on a Monday. The name can be given to either a girl or a boy. Other people in the Himalayan region such as the Ladakhis, the Sikkimese of Northeast India and the Bhutanese people also use the name Dawa in the same sense as the Tibetans.

People with this name include:

Sportspeople
Pasang Dawa Lama (1912–1982), Nepalese mountaineer
Dawa Dachhiri Sherpa (born 1969), Nepalese cross-country skier
Chhang Dawa Sherpa (born 1982), Nepalese mountaineer
Dawa Steven Sherpa (born 1984), Nepalese mountaineer
Dawa Tshering (born 1985), Bhutanese football midfielder
Dawa Gyeltshen (born 1986), Bhutanese football defender
Dawa Yangzum Sherpa (born 1990), Nepalese mountaineer
Lungtok Dawa (born 1998), Bhutanese football forward

Other
Dawa Sangpo (?), king of Shambala
Dawa Gyaltsen, Dzogchen Buddhist master who lived in Zhangzhung
Kazi Dawa Samdup (1868–1922), Indian translator of Tibetan Buddhist works
Dawa Narbula (born 1935), Indian politician, member of the Lok Sabha for Darjeeling, West Bengal
Dawa Tsering (born 1935), Bhutanese politician, Minister of Foreign Affairs in the 1980s–1990s
Tashi Dawa (born 1959), Chinese writer
Alan Dawa Dolma (born 1987), Chinese singer

See also
Dawa Lake, lake in Coqên County, Ngari Prefecture, Tibet Autonomous Region, China

References

Tibetan names